

The Antonov A-13 was a Soviet aerobatic sailplane flown in the 1950s and 1960s. It was a small, single-seat, all-metal aircraft developed from the A-11 which could optionally be fitted with that aircraft's longer-span wings. It was a mid-wing monoplane with a tadpole-like fuselage and a V-tail. 

In February 1962, an A-13 was fitted with a small turbojet engine to set a world airspeed record of 196 km/h (122 mph) for an aircraft weighing up to 500 kg. This jet-powered version was known as the An-13

Variants
 A-13 : Single-seat aerobatic sailplane.
 A-13M : Motor glider version, fitted with a low-powered piston engine. 
 An-13 :  Jet-powered version.

Specifications (Antonov A-13)

See also

Notes

References

A-13
Glider aircraft
Motor gliders
1950s Soviet sailplanes
Aircraft first flown in 1958
High-wing aircraft
V-tail aircraft